Qelichabad may refer to:
 Qelichabad, Alborz
 Qelichabad, Dargaz, Razavi Khorasan Province
 Qelichabad, Kalat, Razavi Khorasan Province